Vladimir Jovanović may refer to:

 Vladimir Jovanović (politician) (1833–1922), Serbian philosopher, political theorist, economist, politician, political writer
 Vladimir Jovanović (basketball) (born 1984), Serbian basketball coach (FMP, Cibona, Crvena zvezda, Igokea)
 Vlada Jovanović (born 1973), Serbian basketball coach (Partizan, Lokomotiv Kuban, Shenzhen Aviators, Mega Basket, Budućnost)